Boris Leskin (5 January 1923 – 21 February 2020) was a Soviet and American film and theater actor.

Biography 
Leskin was born on 5 January 1923.  In 1937 his father was arrested and executed. During the World War II Leskin was employed as a sapper at the front and was wounded. He was awarded the Order of the Red Star and medals.

In 1952 he graduated from the Ostrovsky Leningrad Theatre Institute (Leonid Makaryev course). From 1951 to 1980 he worked as an actor in the Tovstonogov Bolshoi Drama Theater.

In 1980 he began his career in the United States as a theater actor in New York City. He was included on the nomination committee for Academy Awards. In 2011 director Eduard Staroselsky made a documentary about him: Bob Has Been Removed. Minesweeper Bolshoi Drama (with Sergei Yursky). Leskin died on 21 February 2020.

Awards
 2006: Pacific Meridian: Best Actor (Everything Is Illuminated)

Selected filmography
 Did We Meet Somewhere Before  (1955)
Unfinished Story (1955)
  Maksim Perepelitsa (1955)
 The Republic of ShKID (1966)
 Intervention (1968)
An Old, Old Tale (1968)
Property of the Republic (1971)
Heavenly Swallows (1976)
An Almost Funny Story (1977)
Khanuma (1978)
The Falcon and the Snowman (1985)
The Package (1989)
 Vampire's Kiss  (1989)
A Couch in New York (1996)
World War III (1998)
Men in Black  (2005)
Everything Is Illuminated  (2005)Cold Souls'' (2009)

References

External links 
 
 Boris Leskin on KinoPoisk

1923 births
2020 deaths
Actors from Chișinău
Soviet male actors
Russian male actors
American male film actors
American male television actors
Soviet emigrants to the United States
Jewish American male actors
Male actors from New York City
Male actors from Saint Petersburg
Jewish Russian actors
Soviet military personnel of World War II
21st-century American Jews